The 12545 / 46 Raxaul Junction–Lokmanya Tilak Terminus Karmabhoomi Express is a Superfast express train belonging to Indian Railways East Central Zone that runs between  and  in India.

It operates as train number 12545 from Raxaul Junction to Lokmanya Tilak Terminus and as train number 12546 in the reverse direction, serving the states of Jharkhand, Bihar, Uttar Pradesh, Madhya Pradesh & Maharashtra.

Coaches
The 12545 / 46 Raxaul Junction–Lokmanya Tilak Terminus Karmabhoomi Express has 23 general unreserved & two SLR (seating with luggage rake) coaches . It does not carry a pantry car.

As is customary with most train services in India, coach composition may be amended at the discretion of Indian Railways depending on demand.

Service

Routing

Traction
As the route is going to electrification, a Samastipur-based WDM-3D diesel locomotive pulls the train up to  later, an electric locomotive WAP-4 pulls the train to its destination.

References

External links
12545 Karmabhoomi Express at India Rail Info
12546 Karmabhoomi Express at India Rail Info

Express trains in India
Transport in Mumbai
Rail transport in Maharashtra
Rail transport in Madhya Pradesh
Rail transport in Uttar Pradesh
Rail transport in Bihar
Rail transport in Jharkhand
Transport in Raxaul